Donal Tuohy (born 20 September 1989) is an Irish hurler who plays as a goalkeeper for club side Crusheen and at inter-county level with the Clare senior hurling team. Tuohy attended NUI Galway. He was part of the university hurling team during their winning 2010 Fitzgibbon Cup campaign.

He left the Clare hurling team in 2021.

Honours
NUI Galway
Fitzgibbon Cup (1): 2010

Crusheen
Clare Senior Hurling Championship (2): 2010, 2011

Clare
All-Ireland Senior Hurling Championship (1): 2013
National Hurling League (1): 2016
All-Ireland Under-21 Hurling Championship (1): 2009
Munster Under-21 Hurling Championship (1): 2009

References

1989 births
Living people
Alumni of the University of Galway
Clare inter-county hurlers
Crusheen hurlers
Hurling goalkeepers
University of Galway hurlers